Half and half nails (also known as "Lindsay's nails") show the proximal portion of the nail white and the distal half red, pink, or brown, with a sharp line of demarcation between the two halves. The darker distal discoloration does not fade on pressure, which differentiates Lindsay's nails from Terry's nails. The discoloration is thought to be due to β-melanocyte–stimulating hormone. Seventy percent of hemodialysis patients and 56% of renal transplant patients have at least one type of nail abnormality.  Absence of lunula, splinter hemorrhage, and half and half nails were significantly more common in hemodialysis patients, while leukonychia was significantly more common in transplant patients.

See also 
 List of cutaneous conditions

References

External links 

Conditions of the skin appendages